Reach Out and Touch may refer to:

 "Reach Out and Touch", 2001 episode of Ally McBeal

Songs
 "Reach Out and Touch (Somebody's Hand)", 1970 solo Motown single by Diana Ross
 Reach Out and Touch, 1982 collegiate album by The New Virginians of Virginia Tech
 "Reach Out and Touch", on the 1985 reggae album A Touch of Class by Sugar Minott
 "Reach Out and Touch", 1989 reggae single by Vitamin X (reggae band)
 "Reach Out and Touch", on the 1994 gospel album Power by Beau Williams
 "Reach Out and Touch", on the 2000 gospel album If That Isn't Love by George Beverly Shea
 "Reach Out and Touch", on the 2008 jazz album Get Up! by Living Waters Jazz
 "Reach Out and Touch", on the 2008 rock/pop album The Singles by Tommy Tutone (a reissue of the song "Reach Out and Touch Her" on the 1995 album Nervous Love)

See also
 "Reach Out and Touch It", song on the 2004 German jazz album The Ground by Tord Gustavsen
 Reach out and touch someone, AT&T advertising jingle coined in 1979 and composed by David Lucas
 Reach Out and Touch Someone, 1980 publication by Carol Lay
 "Reach Out and Touch Someone", 2001 short story by Steven-Elliot Altman
 Reach Out and Touch the Sky, 1981 album by Southside Johnny & The Asbury Jukes
 "Just Reach Out and Touch Me", 1978 single and 1979 country album by Marie Bottrell